The 2009 Hawaii Warriors football team represented the University of Hawaiʻi at Mānoa as a member of the Western Athletic Conference (WAC) during the 2009 NCAA Division I FBS football season. Led by second-year head coach Greg McMackin, the Warriors compiled an overall record of 6–7 with a mark of 3–5 in conference play, placing in a three-way tie for fifth in the WAC. Hawaii played home games at Aloha Stadium in Halawa, Hawaii.

Schedule

References

Hawaii
Hawaii Rainbow Warriors football seasons
Hawaii Warriors football